, also called as Young Disease Outburst Boy in sometimes, is a Japanese mixed-media project. It started as a Vocaloid song series created by Rerulili. The light novel adaptations are written by Rerulili and Minato Tonami, with illustrations by Hoshima, MW, Koji Milk and Akira Ookami, and published by Kadokawa Shoten under their Kadokawa Beans Bunko label. A manga adaptation with illustrations by Megumi Hazuki was serialized in Shueisha's Ribon Special magazine from July 15, 2016, to December 15, 2016, and compiled into a single tankōbon volume. A 11-episode anime television series adaptation aired between October 4, 2019, and December 13, 2019. The series was directed by Kazuya Ichikawa and animated by Studio Deen, with scripts written by Midori Gotou. It is licensed in North America by Sentai Filmworks.

Characters

References

External links
 
 

2019 anime television series debuts
2016 Japanese novels
2018 Japanese novels
2020 Japanese novels
Anime and manga based on light novels
Creative works using vocaloids
Kadokawa Beans Bunko
Kadokawa Dwango franchises
Sentai Filmworks
Shōjo manga
Shueisha manga
Studio Deen